The Girls' Singles tournament of the 2015 BWF World Junior Championships is held on November 10–15. The defending champion of the last edition is Akane Yamaguchi from Japan.

Seeded

  He Bingjiao (Quarterfinals)
  Saena Kawakami (4th round)
  Supanida Katethong (2nd round)
  Goh Jin Wei (Champion)
  Pornpawee Chochuwong (4th round)
  Gregoria Mariska Tunjung (4th round)
  Ruthvika Shivani Gadde (4th round)
  Julie Dawall Jakobsen (Quarterfinals)
  Clara Azurmendi (4th round)
  Aliye Demirbag (3rd round)
  Natsuki Nidaira (Semifinals)
  Kader İnal (1st round)
  Chen Yufei (Quarterfinals)
  Mia Blichfeldt (4th round)
  Joy Lai (3rd round)
  Daniela Macias (2nd round)

Draw

Finals

Top Half

Section 1

Section 2

Section 3

Section 4

Bottom Half

Section 5

Section 6

Section 7

Section 8

References
Main Draw

2015 BWF World Junior Championships
2015 in youth sport